"The Tales of Ba Sing Se" is the 15th episode of the second season of the animated television series Avatar: The Last Airbender. It features six short vignettes of several main characters as they go about an average day in the Earth Kingdom city of Ba Sing Se. It serves as a filler episode and does not focus on the main plot, except for the winged lemur Momo's tale. "The Tales of Ba Sing Se" is a break from the previous dark, plot heavy episodes, and instead focuses on character development.

The first tale is of Katara and Toph, who spend a day at the spa. The sage, yet comedic Iroh's tale is next; he helps various residents of Ba Sing Se, before making a tearful tribute to his son, who died in combat trying to take the city of Ba Sing Se. Aang helps a zookeeper, though not without causing some trouble. Sokka inadvertently enters a Haiku contest. The generally brooding Zuko goes on a date. The last tale centers on Momo, who searches for Aang's lost pet skybison, Appa.

"The Tales of Ba Sing Se" received widespread critical acclaim, with reviewers considering it to be one of the series' best episodes. "The Tale of Iroh" has been especially well-reviewed and is a fan favorite. The episode was dedicated to Iroh's voice actor Mako Iwamatsu, who died before the episode's airing.

Plot synopsis

 Katara and Toph have a "Girl's Day Out" at the Fancy Lady Day Spa.
 While strolling through a market, Iroh stops and buys a few things at a street stand. Continuing his walk, he uses his wisdom to help the people he encounters. Iroh comes to rest upon a hill with a large tree, where he sets up a memorial for the birthday of his deceased son, Lu Ten. (This segment of the episode ends with a dedication to Mako Iwamatsu, Iroh's voice actor, who died on July 21, 2006, after a battle with esophageal cancer.)
 Flying high over Ba Sing Se, Aang lands at a small zoo looking for Appa. The Zookeeper tells Aang that he would like nothing more than to let his animals run wild in open spaces. Aang suggests moving the animals outside to an open area just outside the city. The animals prove too difficult to control and Aang uses his Bending powers to create a new zoo.
 Sokka finds a haiku class full of pretty girls. While peeking through the window, enjoying the 'show', he is shoved from behind by an ostrich horse and winds up inside, where he gets into a haiku contest with the teacher. Sokka eventually adds an extra syllable to the final line, causing him to be ejected from the room by a very large guard.
 Working at the teahouse, Zuko makes a date with a girl named Jin. She asks Zuko about his life, which causes Zuko to make up a story that he and Iroh were part of a traveling circus before they came to Ba Sing Se. They exchange a couple awkward kisses, but Zuko quickly breaks away and returns to his apartment.
 Momo decides to continue searching the city for Appa while being pursued by a trio of Pygmy Pumas. After losing them, a tired Momo lies down in a giant footprint.

Reception
"The Tales of Ba Sing Se" received widespread acclaim, with "The Tale of Iroh" being particularly highlighted, and is considered by critics and fans alike to be one of the best episodes of Avatar.

The Mary Sue described the episode as highly emotional.

The Daily Dot reviewed it as the "best episode of Avatar", noting that it is a much-needed break in an otherwise dark period of the series. The episode falls in the middle of the protagonist's search for the skybison Appa, and provided character building in a lighter atmosphere. The Daily Dot picked Zuko, Momo, and Iroh's tales as the best, noting that Iroh's was "especially memorable". Iroh is often a comedic relief to the brooding Zuko, but the Daily Dot noted this episode provides another, more emotional side of Iroh. The episode also explains why Iroh is going to such great lengths to try to save his nephew Zuko, so that he will not die in war like his son did.

CBR noted that "The Tales of Ba Sing Se" was an example of the great filler episodes in Avatar, and a departure from the generally bland filler episodes in many television shows. CBR especially praised Iroh's tribute to his son as an example of Avatars character building, and described it as "the most touching and memorable tale".

Notes

References

External links

 

Avatar: The Last Airbender
2006 American television episodes